Michel Kermarec (born: 20 June 1958) is a sailor from Gironde, France, who represented his country at the 1988 Summer Olympics in Busan, South Korea as helmsman in the Soling. With crew members Stanislas Dripaux and Xavier Phelipon they took the 6th place.

References

Living people
1958 births
Sailors at the 1988 Summer Olympics – Soling
Olympic sailors of France
French male sailors (sport)
20th-century French people